Fragments of Fear: The Second Cthulhu Companion is a 1985 role-playing game supplement for Call of Cthulhu, published by Chaosium.

Contents
Fragments of Fear: The Second Cthulhu Companion is a 48-page supplement which contains a variety of material including the notes of the fictional Dr. Phileus P. Sadowsky's, additional deities from the writing of author Ramsey Campbell, adventure scenarios, and more.

Reception
Phil Frances reviewed Fragments of Fear for White Dwarf #75, giving it an overall rating of 7 out of 10, and stated that "Overall, Fragments of Fear disappoints me, especially as it follows in the wake of Masks of Nyarlathotep, the best CoC campaign to date."

Guy Hail reviewed Fragments of Fear: The Second Cthulhu Companion in Space Gamer/Fantasy Gamer No. 79. Hail commented that "Chaosium has published a lightly flawed and reasonably priced supplement for the many feverish fans of Call of Cthulhu."

Reviews
Different Worlds #43 (July/Aug., 1986)
 Casus Belli #34 (Aug 1986)

References

Call of Cthulhu (role-playing game) supplements
Role-playing game supplements introduced in 1985